Yashwant Giridhar Mahajan (12 May 1941 - 29 October 2018)  was an Indian politician from the Bharatiya Janata Party (BJP) political party.
He was a member of the 14th Lok Sabha of India, representing the Jalgaon constituency of Maharashtra.

In the sting Operation Duryodhana
by the Noida based media firm Cobrapost, aired 12 December 2005 on the Indian Hindi news TV Channel Aaj Tak, Mahajan was caught on video accepting bribes of Rs. 35,000 for fielding questions in parliament.

On 23 December 2005 a Special Committee of the Lok Sabha found him guilty of contempt of the House and following a motion calling for the expulsion of all 11 MPs caught in the sting, he was expelled from Parliament.

References

1941 births
2018 deaths
Bharatiya Janata Party politicians from Maharashtra
People from Maharashtra
India MPs 2004–2009
Marathi politicians
India MPs 1999–2004
People expelled from public office
Lok Sabha members from Maharashtra
People from Jalgaon